The 2015–16 Cypriot Cup was the 74th edition of the Cypriot Cup. A total of 28 clubs entered the competition. It began on 28 October 2015 with the first round and concluded on 18 May 2016 with the final which was held at Tsirion Stadium. Apollon clinched their 8th Cypriot Cup trophy after a 2–1 victory over Omonia.

First round
The first round draw took place on 19 October 2015 and the matches played on 28 October, 4 November and 2 December 2015.

Second round
The second round draw took place on 21 December 2015 and the matches played on 6, 13, 20, 26 and 27 January 2016.

The following four teams advanced directly to second round and will meet the twelve winners of the first round ties:
APOEL (2014–15 Cypriot Cup winner)
AEL Limassol (2014–15 Cypriot Cup runners-up)
AEK Larnaca (2014–15 Cypriot First Division Fair Play winner)
Pafos FC (2014–15 Cypriot Second Division Fair Play winner)

|}

First leg

Second leg

Quarter-finals
The quarter-finals draw took place on 28 January 2016 and the matches played on 3, 10, 17 and 24 February 2016.

|}

First leg

Second leg

Semi-finals
The semi-finals draw took place on 3 March 2016 and the matches played on 6 and 20 April 2016.

|}

First leg

Second leg

Final

See also	
 2015–16 Cypriot First Division	
 2015–16 Cypriot Second Division

Notes

References

	

Cup
Cyprus
Cypriot Cup seasons